Wayne State may refer to:

Wayne State College, Wayne, Nebraska
Wayne State Wildcats, the athletic program of Wayne State College
Wayne State University, Detroit, Michigan
Wayne State Warriors, the athletic program of Wayne State University